Mount Harrington  is one of the highest peaks in the east end of the Victory Mountains, Victoria Land, Antarctica, rising to  on the west side of Whitehall Glacier and  southwest of Mount Northampton. It was named in 1960 by The New Zealand Antarctic Place-Names Committee after geologist Hilary J. Harrington, who led the New Zealand Geological Survey Antarctic Expedition (NZGSAE) to this region, 1957–58, and also led the NZGSAE in the McMurdo Sound region, 1958–59. Later, he was a United States Antarctic Research Program investigator (with Russell J. Korsch) in the McMurdo Sound region, 1968–69.

References

Mountains of Victoria Land
Borchgrevink Coast